The RML 9-pounder 8 cwt gun and the RML 9-pounder 6 cwt gun were British Rifled, Muzzle Loading (RML) field, horse and naval artillery guns manufactured in England in the 19th century, which fired a projectile weighing approximately . "8 cwt" and "6 cwt" refers to the weight of the gun to differentiate it from other 9-pounder guns.

Service history 

The 9-pounder 8 cwt Rifled Muzzle Loader was the field gun selected by the Royal Artillery in 1871 to replace the more sophisticated RBL 12 pounder 8 cwt Armstrong gun, which had acquired a reputation for unreliability. The gun was rifled using the system developed by William Palliser, in which studs protruding from the side of the shell engaged with three spiral grooves in the barrel. In 1874, a 6 cwt version was introduced for horse artillery and was later adopted for field artillery use, replacing the 8 cwt version. All variants used the same ammunition, which took the form of shrapnel shell, case shot and common shell.

The 9-pounder remained in front-line service with the Royal Artillery until 1878 when the RML 13 pounder 8 cwt gun was introduced, however it remained in use with colonial forces until 1895 and saw action in the Anglo-Zulu War of 1879, the First Boer War of 1881 and the Anglo-Egyptian War in 1882. A number were issued to British Artillery Volunteer units, with the 1st Ayrshire and Galloway Artillery Volunteers being issued with some guns as late as 1901.

Variants 
 9-pounder 8 cwt Mark I (Land Service): Introduced into the Royal Artillery in 1871. It was later withdrawn and modified for sea service.
 9-pounder 8 cwt Mark II (Naval Service): Introduced in 1873 by the Royal Navy.
 9-pounder 6 cwt Mark I (N.S.): A few were made for experimental trials but they proved to be too short; some were issued to the Royal Indian Navy. In 1873, forty five were completed for use as boat guns.
 9-pounder 6 cwt Mark II (L.S.): A new design in 1874 for the Royal Horse Artillery, it was longer than the 8 cwt gun but had the same carriage.
 9-pounder 6 cwt Mark III (N.S.): Introduced in 1879, a modified Mark II for naval service.
 9-pounder 6 cwt Mark IV (N.S.): Similar to the Mark III with a steel jacket instead of wrought iron previously used, and with a strengthened cascabel.

Surviving examples 
 Royal Artillery Museum (the collection is currently in storage awaiting relocation to a new site)
 Fort Nelson, Hampshire, Royal Armouries Collection
 Southsea Castle, Hampshire, England
 North Battleford Museum, Saskatchewan
 CFB Petawawa, Ontario
 New Brunswick Military History Museum, CFB Gagetown, New Brunswick
 Fort Hughes (New Brunswick), New Brunswick
 Royal Kennebecasis Yacht Club, New Brunswick
 Fort Anne, Nova Scotia
 Fort St Catherine, Bermuda
 Australian Army Artillery Museum, Manly, New South Wales
 Fort Lytton Military Museum, Brisbane, Queensland, Australia – gun and ammunition
 Notre-Dame-des-Neiges cemetery, Montréal
 Telangana State Archaeology Museum, Hyderabad, India

See also 
 List of field guns

References

Further reading 
 Captain John F Owen R.A., "Treatise on the Construction and Manufacture of Ordnance in the British Service", Prepared in the Royal Gun Factory, London, 1877, pages 254-257, 292.

External links 

 9 Pounder Club of preserved and display guns in Canada
 Handbook for the 9-pr. R.M.L. guns of 6 cwt. and 8 cwt. land service, 1889, 1892, 1895 at State Library of Victoria
 Handbook for 9-pr. R.M.L. guns of 6 cwt. and 8 cwt. Land service 1895, 1901 at State Library of Victoria
 Handbook for 9-pr R.M.L. guns of 6cwt. and 8cwt., (Movable armament) 1898 at State Library of Victoria
 Armstrong RML 9-pounder Mark II – views of the 9-pounder gun and its limber from the original handbook. Courtesy of the Royal Artillery Historical Trust

76 mm artillery
Artillery of the United Kingdom
Field artillery
Victorian-era weapons of the United Kingdom